Stinson is an unincorporated community in Lawrence County, in the U.S. state of Missouri.

History
A post office called Stinson was established in 1895, and remained in operation until 1906. J. L. Stinston, an early postmaster, gave the community his last name.

References

Unincorporated communities in Lawrence County, Missouri
Unincorporated communities in Missouri